Gekkonomorpha is a clade of lizards that includes geckos and their closest relatives. Although it was first named in 1900, Gekkonomorpha was not widely used as a formal taxon until it was given a phylogenetic definition in the 1990s. Under this definition, Gekkonomorpha is a stem-based taxon containing the node-based taxon Gekkota, the group that includes the last common ancestor of all living geckos and its descendants. The extent of Gekkonomorpha beyond gekkotans differs between studies. For example, Lee (1998) defined Gekkonomorpha in such a way that it included not only Gekkota but the legless amphisbaenian and dibamid lizards as well. The phylogenetic analysis of Conrad (2008), which did not support a close relationship between geckos and legless lizards, used Gekkonomorpha in a much more restrictive sense so that it included only Gekkota and a few extinct lizards more closely related to Gekkota than to any other living group of lizards (making them "stem" gekkotans). Some of the most recent phylogenetic analyses suggest that the extinct lizards Gobekko and Parviraptor may be stem gekkotans, although other analyses find that Gobekko may instead be within Gekkota and Parviraptor outside Gekkonomorpha.

References

Geckos
Extant Early Cretaceous first appearances